Jayton High School or Jayton School is a public high school located in the community of Jayton, Texas, in Kent County, United States and classified as a 1A school by the UIL.   It is a part of the Jayton-Girard Independent School District located in central Kent County serving the communities of Jayton, Girard, and surrounding rural areas.  In 2015, the school was rated "Met Standard" by the Texas Education Agency.

Athletics
The Jayton Jaybirds compete in these sports - 

Cross Country, 6-Man Football, Basketball, Golf, Tennis & Track

State Titles
Football - 
1984 (6M), 1985 (6M)

State Finalists
Boys Basketball
2023 (1A)

Band
Marching Band State Champions 
1997 (1A), 1999 (1A)

See also
List of Six-man football stadiums in Texas

References

External links
Jayton-Girard ISD

Public high schools in Texas